The 2017–18 East Superleague (known as the McBookie.com East Superleague for sponsorship reasons) was the 16th season of the East Superleague, the top tier of league competition for SJFA East Region member clubs.

The season began on 5 August 2017 and ended on 2 June 2018. Kelty Hearts were the reigning champions but did not defend their title after joining the East of Scotland Football League.

Bonnyrigg Rose Athletic clinched the championship on 26 May 2018, the club's second title in three seasons. As winners they entered the Preliminary Round of the 2018–19 Scottish Cup.

Teams
The following teams changed division prior to the 2017–18 season.

To East Superleague
Promoted from East Premier League
 Sauchie Juniors
 Kennoway Star Hearts
 Forfar West End

From East Superleague
Relegated to East Premier League
 Musselburgh Athletic
 Fauldhouse United
Transferred to East of Scotland League
 Kelty Hearts

Forfar West End were promoted after defeating Newtongrange Star 3–2 on aggregate in the East Region Super/Premier League Play Off; however, Newtongrange were reprieved from relegation to balance league numbers following the departure of Kelty.

Stadia and locations

Managerial changes

League table
With eleven Superleague clubs moving to the East of Scotland Football League for the 2018–19 season, relegation was suspended pending league reconstruction.

Results

References

6
East Superleague seasons